Nicolas "Nick" Cross (born September 10, 2001) is an American football safety for the Indianapolis Colts of the National Football League (NFL). He played college football at Maryland.

Early years
Cross was born on September 10, 2001, the son of Michael and Anna Cross. His father, Michael, is from Jamaica and his mother is from Trinidad and Tobago. He attended the St. Jerome Academy in Hyattsville, Maryland for his early education.

High school career
Cross attended DeMatha Catholic High School in Hyattsville, Maryland. He played in the 2019 Army All-American Bowl. Cross was rated as four star recruit. He originally committed to Florida State University to play college football but switched to the University of Maryland, College Park.
Cross also ran track while at DeMatha Catholic. He competed in the 60M, 100M, 200M, 4x100M relay, and 4x200M relay. He holds a personal best of 6.68s in the 60M.

College career
Cross played at Maryland from 2019 to 2021. During his career he started 21 of 29 games and recorded 134 tackles, six interceptions, three forced fumbles, and four sacks. After the 2021 season, he decided to forgo his senior season and enter the 2022 NFL Draft.

College statistics

Professional career
Cross, along with former teammate Chigoziem Okonkwo, participated in the 2022 NFL Scouting Combine. Cross had the fastest 40 yard dash, among safeties, with a time of 4.34 seconds (Other stats provided by combine below).

Cross was drafted by the Indianapolis Colts in the third round, 96th overall, of the 2022 NFL Draft.

References

Further reading

 Andrew Moore, "Nick Cross: Indianapolis Colts Rookie Files," Horseshoe Huddle, September 2, 2022.

External links
 Indianapolis Colts bio
Maryland Terrapins bio

Living people
Players of American football from Maryland
Sportspeople from the Washington metropolitan area
American football safeties
Maryland Terrapins football players
People from Bowie, Maryland
Indianapolis Colts players
2001 births